Aleksinsky (masculine), Aleksinskaya (feminine), or Aleksinskoye (neuter) is the name of several rural localities in Arkhangelsk Oblast, Russia:
Aleksinskaya, Kargopolsky District, Arkhangelsk Oblast, a village in Tikhmangsky Selsoviet of Kargopolsky District
Aleksinskaya, Velsky District, Arkhangelsk Oblast, a village in Khozminsky Selsoviet of Velsky District